Sanger Brown (1February 16 1852–1928) was an American physician. He was born in Bloomfield (Ontario), Canada, graduated in 1880 at the Bellevue Hospital Medical College (New York City), was assistant physician at the Bloomingdale Asylum for the Insane (White Plains, N. Y.) in 1882–1885, and acting medical superintendent there in 1886. In 1890 he was appointed professor of neurology in the Post-Graduate Medical School of Chicago, and in 1901–1906 was associate professor of medicine and clinical medicine at the College of Physicians and Surgeons in the same city. In his experiments with E. A. Schäfer at University College, London, in 1886–1887, he was the first to demonstrate conclusively that in monkeys the centre of vision is located in the occipital lobe. In 1908 he joined the United States Army Medical Reserve Corps with rank of first lieutenant.

Work 
Known for Sanger-Brown cerebellar ataxia. He described it in 1892, it is one of the unusual types collected by Pierre Marie in 1893. It is accompanied by numerous ophthalmic abnormalities and pathologic changes in several tracts of the spinal cord.

References

American neurologists
United States Army officers
1852 births
1928 deaths
American hospital administrators